Eoin Toolan (born 1982) is an Irish professional rugby union football coach. He is currently the head coach of the Melbourne Rising team that plays in the NRC competition, while he is also a performance analyst for the Melbourne Rebels. Toolan was a former Greystones Rugby Football Club player in Ireland. He was previously performance analyst for the Ireland national team.

References

1982 births
Living people
Irish rugby union coaches